is a railway station  in the town of Ōkuma, Fukushima, Japan, operated by the  East Japan Railway Company (JR East).

Lines
However, due to the Fukushima Daiichi nuclear disaster, services were suspended until March 14, 2020.

Station layout
The station has an elevated station building with one island platform underneath. The station had a Midori no Madoguchi staffed ticket office. But it is now an unmanned station (from 14 March 2020).

Platforms

History
Ōno Station was opened on 22 November 1904. The station was absorbed into the JR East network upon the privatization of the Japanese National Railways (JNR) on 1 April 1987. The station was closed on 11 March 2011 following the Fukushima Daiichi nuclear disaster. The section of the line between Tomioka and Namie was reopened on the 14 March 2020 allowing for the resumption of passenger services to Ōno Station.

Passenger statistics
In fiscal 2010, the station was used by an average of 616 passengers daily (boarding passengers only). The passenger figures for previous years are as shown below.

Surrounding area
Ōno Station is located three kilometers west of the Fukushima Daiichi Nuclear Power Plant and is the closest train station to the plant. Entering the area is currently prohibited due to high radiation levels.
 Ōkuma Town Hall
 Ōkuma Post Office

See also
 List of railway stations in Japan

References

External links

  

Railway stations in Japan opened in 1904
Railway stations in Fukushima Prefecture
Jōban Line
Railway stations closed in 2011
Stations of East Japan Railway Company
Ōkuma, Fukushima